Tholi Prema is a 1998 Indian Telugu-language romantic drama film written and directed by A. Karunakaran. It stars Pawan Kalyan and Keerthi Reddy, with music composed by Deva. The cinematography was done by Y. Maheedhar and Chota K. Naidu. 

The film won the National Film Award for Best Feature Film in Telugu, six state Nandi Awards, and was featured in the Indian Panorama mainstream section at the 30th International Film Festival of India. The film was later dubbed into Tamil as Aanandamazhai, remade in Kannada as Preethsu Thappenilla (2000), and Hindi as Mujhe Kucch Kehna Hai (2001),

Plot 
Balu is the youngest son in his family and carefree. His father often scolds him, but his uncles and mother dote on him so does his brother. He has a bunch of friends  to hang around. On a late Diwali night,  Balu's father is angry with him and he goes out for a stroll. On this night, Balu happens to see a girl Anu with a white chudidar , playing with children although revealing only her feet. He instantly falls for her. He learns that she has returned from the US to spend time with her grandfather, awaiting her Harvard call.

Anu is impressed with Balu when he saves a child's life on the motorway; she tries to get his autograph but fails. Balu leaves for Ooty for his studies and accidentally meets Anu on the way when his taxi breaks down. Anu gives Balu a lift and leaves her driver to help the taxi driver. While on the way, Anu's car slips into a valley due to a rash lorry driver. Balu makes an effort to save Anu and rescues her to safer ground. Trying to save Anu, Balu slips off into a valley. Anu is depressed that Balu sacrificed himself to save her, searches for him and loses hope. Balu is saved by a truck driver and admitted to a hospital. On his return, Anu meets Balu at his house to express her gratitude. Balu thinks of proposing his love, but is warned by his sister Priya. Balu develops a friendship with Anu, but never dares to express his love. Priya gets married and leaves. At the same time, Anu is admitted to Harvard University and is about to leave. They remain silent until they reach the airport. His goal is to make her realize how much he loves her. As they wait for the flight announcement, she realizes that she is indeed in love with Balu. She gets emotional and hugs him. She says that she needs him more than Harvard. An emotional Balu iterates that she has worked hard and she is waiting for this day and shouldn't miss the chance for love. They agree to reunite after they have realized their goals.

Cast 

 Pawan Kalyan as Balu
 Keerthi Reddy as Anu
 Ali as Balu's friend
 Venu Madhav as Arnold Sekhar
 Narra Venkateswara Rao as Viswanatham, Balu's father
 Nagesh as Elder uncle
 Achyuth as Anil
 Prasanna Kumar
 Ravi Babu 
 P. J. Sarma as Anu's grandfather
 Vasuki as Bujji / Priya, Balu's sister
 Sangeetha as Balu's mother
 Bangalore Padma
 Manisha
 Narra Srinu as Bouncer 
 Chaplin Balu as Balu's friend
 A. Karunakaran in a cameo appearance

Soundtrack 

The soundtrack was composed by Deva. Four of the film's five songs are based on other songs without acknowledgement: "Yemaindo Yemo Ee Vela" is based on Ricky Martin's "Maria"; "Emi Sodhara" is based on "Pyaar ka Musafir" by Lucky Ali; "Romance Rhythms" is based on "Noonday Sun" by Deep Forest; and "Ee Manase Se Se" is based on "Alabalaba (Woman’a’Sexy)" by Dr. Alban. There is no female voice in any of the songs in the movie.

Awards

Release 
The film had run for more than 100 days in 21 centres; it ran for more than 200 days in 2 centres. It was the winner of six Nandi Awards and National Award Best Feature Film (Telugu) and ran for more than 365 days.

References

External links 
 

1998 films
Telugu films remade in other languages
Films scored by Deva (composer)
Films directed by A. Karunakaran
1990s Telugu-language films
Best Telugu Feature Film National Film Award winners